Ranter-Go-Round is a primitive gambling game and children's game using playing cards. It is known in most European countries as Cuckoo; the French variant being called Coucou. Other English-language names include Chase the Ace and, in America, Screw Your Neighbor which, however, is a name also used for other games.

It is related to the dedicated deck card or tile games of Gnav and Killekort.

History 
Ranter Go Round is described as early as 1881. The game "is said to have been first played in Cornwall," however Cuckoo has been played in Europe since at least the 17th century, often with special cards. An 1882 account describes Ranter Go Round as "a first-rate game for a winter evening." Players have three lives in the form of counters, receive one card each and exchange with their left-hand neighbours, the dealer exchanging with the stock. Players may stand i.e. refuse to exchange if they believe they have a card high enough not to lose. There are no cards with special privileges. 

Confusingly, at about the same time the name Ranter-Go-Round appears in the literature associated with the different game of Snip, Snap, Snorem. For example, in 1879 in a publication by the English Dialect Society it is described as "an old-fashioned game of cards, marked with chalk upon a bellows or tea-tray. Now at a table, and called Miss Joan. This is followed by the lines 'Here's a card, as you may see! Here's another as good as he! Here's the best of all the three; And here's Miss Joan, come tickle me. Wee, wee!'" The same description appears in the West Cornwall Glossary of 1880.

Play

Any number of players may participate, using a standard deck of 52 cards without jokers. The card rankings (from highest to lowest) are K-Q-J-10-9-8-7-6-5-4-3-2-A, or alternately A-K-Q-J-10-9-8-7-6-5-4-3-2. Suits are irrelevant. The goal in each hand is to avoid ending up with a lower-valued card than any other player.

Each player starts the game with the same number of chips or counters, usually two to four. When the game is played for money, all players contribute the same amount to a central pot. Each player is dealt one card face-down, after which play begins with the player to the left of the dealer. After examining this card, a player may either keep it or exchange it with the player on the left. However, if the intended recipient is holding a card of the highest value (depending on which set of rankings is being used), the recipient turns that card face-up and the trade is nullified. Any player who shows a top-value card in this manner is considered to have finished for that hand. Play proceeds clockwise around the table, with the dealer playing last; instead of trading cards with someone else, though, the dealer may exchange his or her card for the top one from the deck.

After all players have taken a turn, they turn their cards face-up and the one with the lowest-valued card loses one chip. If two or more players tie for lowest card, they each lose one chip, except in variants that include "pairing up". The dealer rotates one position clockwise around the table for each new hand. Players who lose all their chips are out of the game; the last remaining player wins and collects all the money in the pot. However, if the last two players both lose their final chips in a tie, the game has no winner; the money remains in the pot, and all players make a further bet and start a new game.

Variants
 Players holding cards of the same value are considered to have "paired up," and their combined cards outrank any single card regardless of its value. For example, in a four-player game, two players holding sixes would outrank one opponent with a king and another with a queen; the queen is now the low card and must give up one chip. If two or more groups pair up in a single hand, higher pairs beat lower ones, triples beat pairs, and quartets beat triples.
 Players stuck with an ace have to pay double.
 When exchanging the dealer may cut the deck and then turn up the top card.
 The dealer is not allowed to exchange with the deck if the top card is a king.
 If the player who is forced to exchange gives an ace or deuce (2), they announce it aloud, but the player who initiated the exchange says nothing (as the initiator's card may be passed on).
 Counters are not used and the player with the lowest card at the end of each round is immediately eliminated from the game.
 A player who runs out of chips may be allowed to remain in the game, but is eliminated upon losing one more hand.
 Sometimes the object is to avoid having the highest card in the deck.  The order, from high to low, would be A Q J 10 9 8 7 6 5 4 3 2 K.  The king is the lowest as it is the best card in the deck, regardless of value.
 If the dealer chooses to trade cards and receives one of the same rank from the top of the deck, they immediately wins the hand and all other players lose one chip. Alternatively, the dealer becomes immune for that hand and the player with the lowest remaining card loses a chip, even if it is higher than the dealer's card.
 Kings Jerk - Any player dealt a king may take a chip from the pot, if one is available at the start of the hand.
 King Stops All Play - A player dealt a king turns it face-up upon being asked to trade or when their turn comes. All play immediately stops and the loser of the hand is determined based on the cards held at that moment.

References

Bibliography 
 _ (1879). Specimens of English Dialects. English Dialect Society.
 _ (1881). Cassell's Book of In-Door Amusements, Card Games and Fireside Fun. Cassell.
 _ (1882). Cassell's Book of Sports and Pastimes. London, Paris and New York: Cassell, Petter, Galpin.
 Courtney, Margaret Ann (1880). West Cornwall Glossary. London: Trübner.

External links 
 Cuckoo at pagat.com

19th-century card games
Comparing card games
Cuckoo group